Oscar Damián Rodríguez Cantos (born 27 July 1974 in Porto Alegre, Brazil) is a Uruguayan footballer.

Early life

Rodriguez moved to Uruguay from Brazil at the age of two.

References

External links

Profile at tenfieldigital

Uruguayan footballers
Uruguay international footballers
Brazilian footballers
Uruguayan expatriate footballers
Deportivo Español footballers
Godoy Cruz Antonio Tomba footballers
Expatriate footballers in Argentina
Expatriate footballers in Colombia
Expatriate footballers in Mexico
Expatriate footballers in Peru
Expatriate footballers in Ukraine
Club Nacional de Football players
América de Cali footballers
Cienciano footballers
Dorados de Sinaloa footballers
FC Shakhtar Donetsk players
Central Español players
Uruguayan Primera División players
Ukrainian Premier League players
Association football forwards
Footballers from Porto Alegre
1974 births
Living people